In basketball, the basketball court is the playing surface, consisting of a rectangular floor, with baskets at each end. Indoor basketball courts are almost always made of polished wood, usually maple, with -high rims on each basket. Outdoor surfaces are generally made from standard paving materials such as concrete or asphalt. International competitions may use glass basketball courts.

Dimensions 
Basketball courts come in many different sizes. In amateur basketball, court sizes vary widely.

Basketball courts have a three-point arc at both baskets. A basket made from behind this arc is worth three points; a basket made from within this line, or with a player's foot touching the line, is worth 2 points. The free-throw line, where one stands while taking a foul shot, is located within the three-point arc at 15 feet from the plane of the backboard. A foul shot is worth 1 point, but if a shot is made from the foul line while in play it is still worth 2 points.

Diagrams

Table

Sections

Center circle
The only two players permitted to enter this area prior to the tipoff are the players contesting the jump ball (usually but not always centers). Both players jump when the referee throws the ball in the air, each attempting to tap the ball into the hands of a player of their own team.

Three-point line
The three-point line is the line that separates the two-point area from the three-point area; any shot made beyond this line counts as three points. If the shooting player steps on the line, it is counted as two points. Any foul made in the act of shooting beyond the three-point line would give the player three free throws if the shot does not go in, and one if it does.

The distance to the three-point line from the center of the basket varies depending on the level or league, and has changed several times. These are the current distances, with the league or level using each distance:

 19.75 ft (6.02 m): High schools (US)
 21.65 ft (6.60 m) to 22.15 ft (6.75 m): FIBA and NCAA
 22 ft (6.71 m) to 22.15 ft (6.75 m): WNBA
 22 ft (6.71 m) to 23.75 ft (7.24 m): NBA

The NBA adopted the three-point line at the start of the 1979–80 season. During the 1994–95, 1995–96 and 1996–97 seasons, the NBA attempted to address decreased scoring by shortening the overall distance of the line to a uniform  around the basket. It was moved back to its original distance after the 1996–97 season. FIBA and the NCAA both adopted the three-point line in 1985.

In most high school associations in the United States, the distance is 19.75 feet. This was formerly the distance for college basketball as well. On May 26, 2007, the NCAA playing rules committee agreed to move the three-point line back one foot to 20.75 feet for the men. This rule went into effect for the 2008–2009 season. The three-point line for women (NCAA) moved back one foot to 20.75 feet at the start of the 2011–12 season. During the 2019 offseason, the NCAA men's playing rules committee adopted the FIBA arc in a two-phase implementation, with Division I adopting the new arc in 2019–20 and other NCAA divisions doing so in 2020–21. The NCAA women's arc was moved to the FIBA arc starting in 2021–22.

The international distance, used in most countries outside the United States, as well as in FIBA and NCAA competition, is currently 6.6 m (21.65 ft) to 6.75 m (22.15 ft). The WNBA uses FIBA's arc except in the corner area, where the minimum distance is the NBA standard of 22 ft (6.71 m).

Perimeter
The perimeter is defined as the areas outside the free throw lane and inside the three-point line. Shots converted (successfully made) from this area are called "perimeter shots" or "outside shots" as called during older NBA games.
If a player's foot is on the three-point line, the shot is considered a perimeter shot.

Low post area
The low post is defined as the areas closest to the basket but outside of the free throw lane. This area is fundamental to strategy in basketball. Skilled low post players can score many points per game without ever taking a jump shot.

Key 

The key, free throw lane or shaded lane refers to the usually painted area beneath the basket; for the NBA, it is 16.02 feet (wider for FIBA tournaments). Since October 2010, the FIFA-spec key has been a rectangle 4.9 m wide and 5.8 m long. Previously, it was a trapezoid 3.7 meters (12 ft) wide at the free-throw line and 6 meters (19 feet and 6.25 inches) at the end line; the NBA and U.S. college basketball has always used a rectangle key.

The key is primarily used to prevent players from staying beneath the basket of the opponents' team for long periods (maximum three seconds).

The no charge zone arc is a semi-circular arc drawn around the area directly underneath the basket. With some exceptions, members of the defending team cannot draw charging fouls in this area.
The no charge zone arc in all North American rule sets above high school level (NCAA men's and women's, NBA, and WNBA) has a radius 4 feet (1.22 m) from below the center of the basket. The no charge zone arc rule first appeared at any level of basketball in the NBA in the 1997–98 season. The NCAA restricted area arc was originally established for the 2011–12 men's and women's seasons at a  radius from below the center of the basket, and was extended to match the 4-foot radius for the 2015–16 season and beyond.

Baseline
The baseline or endline is the boundary line running the end of the court, and usually measures 50 feet long. Inbounds passes after made baskets are taken from the baseline.

Other lines
On NBA floors, two hash marks are drawn at the end lines near the key to mark the area known as the lower defensive box. A defensive player is allowed to draw a charging foul within the restricted arc if the offensive player receives the ball and/or starts his drive within this area.

Also, two lines are drawn on each of the sidelines, 28 feet from each of the endlines, which designates the extent of the coaching box and bench. This line marks the farthest extent a coach (aside from the sidelines) can stand. Directly behind this area is the team bench.

On the half-court line of NBA floors two lines extend outside the playing court, designating the place where substitutes wait before they can enter the playing court; directly behind this area are the various off-court officials such as the timekeeper and reserve referee.

FIBA changes

On April 26, 2008, FIBA announced several major rules changes involving the court markings. These changes took effect for major international competitions on October 1, 2010, after that year's World Championships for men and women, and became mandatory for other competitions on October 1, 2012 (although national federations could adopt the new markings before 2012). The changes were as follows.
 The shape of the key changed from a trapezoid to a rectangle as it is in the NBA, with NBA dimensions.
 The FIBA adopted the NBA's restricted area arc with a marginally wider radius of 1.25 meters (4 ft 1.2 in).

References

External links

 Free Basketball Court Layout Template

Court
Court
Sports rules and regulations
Sports venues by type
Playing field surfaces
Basketball equipment